Harry Ellbracht (born 13 September 1953) is a retired German football forward.

References

External links
 

1953 births
Living people
German footballers
Bundesliga players
2. Bundesliga players
VfL Bochum players
1. FC Saarbrücken players
Arminia Bielefeld players
TSV 1860 Munich players
Association football forwards
People from Kamen
Sportspeople from Arnsberg (region)
Footballers from North Rhine-Westphalia